Humberstone railway station was a railway station serving the eastern side of Leicester. It was on the Great Northern Railway Leicester branch. The station opened in 1882 and closed to regular traffic in 1953 but remained open for summer weekend specials until 1962.

References

Disused railway stations in Leicestershire
Railway stations in Great Britain opened in 1882
Railway stations in Great Britain closed in 1953
Former Great Northern Railway stations